The Brooklyn–Queens Greenway is a bicycling and pedestrian path connecting parks and roads in the New York City boroughs of Brooklyn and Queens, connecting Coney Island in the south to Fort Totten in the north, on Long Island Sound. The route connects major sites in the two boroughs, such as the New York Aquarium, Brooklyn Museum, the Brooklyn Botanic Garden, the New York Hall of Science and Citi Field.

The Greenway is being developed under the joint auspices of the New York City Department of Transportation and the New York City Department of Parks and Recreation. As of 2007, the majority of the route is in parks or otherwise segregated from motor traffic. The remainder is implemented as painted lanes or signed routes in streets.

The 40-mile (64 km) route includes portions of existing bike routes in Prospect Park, and along Eastern Parkway and Ocean Parkway in Brooklyn, and in Alley Pond Park, Cunningham Park, Forest Park, Kissena Park and Ridgewood Reservoir in Queens.

Queens

The northern terminus of the Brooklyn–Queens Greenway is in Little Bay Park, near the north end of Utopia Parkway in the shadow of the Throgs Neck Bridge. Passing the entrance to Fort Totten Park, the Greenway runs south, parallel to the Cross Island Parkway and is known as "Joe Michaels Mile." After crossing busy Northern Boulevard, the route becomes a well signed bike route along quiet residential streets, climbing to the former Long Island Motor Parkway.

The LIMP section of the Greenway is above-grade and most is closed to motor vehicle traffic. Using the LIMP, a branch of the Greenway goes eastward into Alley Pond Park to picnic tables, tennis courts and locker rooms. This eastern branch proceeds to the Alley Pond Adventure Course and the Winchester Boulevard bike lane.

The westward or main line of the Greenway makes its way through Cunningham Park and Kissena Park, and eventually goes around the south side of Queens Botanical Garden on streets, crossing the Whitestone Expressway on its own high overpass into Flushing Meadows-Corona Park.

Once in Flushing Meadows, the Greenway runs along the eastern shores of both Meadow and Willow Lakes, exiting the park onto Jewel Avenue. The route continues on quiet residential streets such as Hoover and Coolidge Avenues, and on more heavily trafficked ones such as Main Street, and crosses Queens Boulevard. The Greenway enters Forest Park at the Overlook and continues down Forest Park Drive passing the Urban Park Ranger station at Woodhaven Boulevard, the George Seuffert, Sr. Bandshell, and the Forest Park Golf Course. Exiting the park, the Greenway continues along parts of Cooper Avenue and other local streets to Highland Park and the Ridgewood Reservoir.

Brooklyn
After exiting Highland Park, the Brooklyn leg of the Greenway uses various local streets in East New York to connect to Eastern Parkway. From here to the end, there is little mixing with motor traffic for the 3-mile (5 km) Eastern Parkway bike route, 2 miles (3 km) through Prospect Park, and the 5-mile (8 km) Ocean Parkway to the southern terminus at the Riegelmann Boardwalk in Coney Island. The Brooklyn portion is less hilly than the Queens portion, except in Prospect Park where it crosses over the terminal moraine that divides Long Island in half.

See also 
Cycling in New York City
Manhattan Waterfront Greenway

References

Cycling in New York City
Bike paths in New York City
Tourist attractions in Brooklyn
Tourist attractions in Queens, New York
greenways in New York City
Hiking trails in New York City